State Route 335 (SR 335) is a  east–west state highway located entirely within Jackson County in the northeastern part of the U.S. state of Georgia. It connects Jefferson to Nicholson.

Route description
SR 335 begins at an intersection with SR 15 Alt./SR 82 (Sycamore Street) in Jefferson. The highway travels to the east, through rural portions of Jackson County. At Yz Sailor Road, the name changes from Danielsville Street to Brockton Road, and at Rabbit Run it becomes Jefferson Drive until it meets its eastern terminus, an intersection with US 441/SR 15 (Main Street) in Nicholson. Here, the roadway continues as Mulberry Street.

SR 335 is not part of the National Highway System, a system of roadways important to the nation's economy, defense, and mobility.

History

The roadway that would eventually be designated as SR 335 was built in the late 1950s along its current alignment. By 1963, this road was designated, and paved, as SR 335.

Major intersections

See also

References

External links

335
Transportation in Jackson County, Georgia